Urraca (also spelled Hurraca, Urracha and Hurracka in medieval Latin) is a female first name. In  Spanish, the name means magpie, derived perhaps from Latin furax, meaning "thievish", in reference to the magpie's tendency to collect shiny items. The name may be of Basque origin, as suggested by onomastic analysis.

Urraca (9th century), purported wife of García Íñiguez of Pamplona
Urraca bint Qasi (fl. 917–929), wife of Fruela II of León
Urraca Sánchez of Pamplona (10th century), wife of Ramiro II of León
Urraca Fróilaz (fl. 969–978), wife of Aznar Purcelliz
Urraca Garcés (died before 1008), wife of Fernán González of Castile and William II Sánchez of Gascony
Urraca Fernández (died 1005/7), wife of Ordoño III of León, Ordoño IV of León and of Sancho II of Pamplona
Urraca of Covarrubias (died 1038), abbess and daughter of García Fernández of Castile
Urraca, apparently Gómez (died 1039), wife of Sancho García of Castile
Urraca Sánchez (died 1041), wife of Sancho VI William of Gascony
Urraca Sánchez (11th century), wife of Alfonso V of León
Urraca of Zamora (1033/4–1101), daughter of King Ferdinand I of León.
Urraca of León and Castile (Urraca the Reckless) (1082–1129), Queen of León and Castile, daughter of Alfonso VI, wife of Alfonso I of Aragon, mother of Alfonso VII
Urraca of Castile, Queen of Navarre (Urraca the Asturian) (1132–1164), daughter of Alfonso VII of León and Castile, and queen consort of García Ramírez of Navarre
Urraca of Portugal (1151–1188), daughter of Alfonso I of Portugal and wife of King Ferdinand II of León
Urraca of Castile, Queen of Portugal (1186/1187–1220), daughter of Alfonso VIII of Castile and Leonor of England
Princess Urraca of Bourbon-Two Sicilies (1913–1999), daughter of Prince Ferdinand Pius, Duke of Calabria (1869–1960) and his wife Princess Maria Ludwiga Theresia of Bavaria (1872–1954)

References
Jaime de Salazar y Acha. 2006. "Urraca: un nombre egregio en la onomástica altomedieval". En la España medieval, 29 (Extra 1), 29–48. Also published in Estudios de genealogía, heráldica y nobiliaria, ed. Miguel Angel Laredo Quesada, 29–48.

Disambiguation
Urraca may also refer to:
 Urraca Mesa, a mesa in northern New Mexico on the property of Philmont Scout Ranch, which is the most lightning-struck place in the state and has religious significance to a number of local indigenous tribes
 Urracá, indigenous freedom fighter of colonial Panama
 Urracá, Panama, a corregimiento in Panama
 Urraca, a planned, but cancelled, very high altitude (above 1000 kilometers) nuclear test in the Operation Fishbowl series  in 1962.

Spanish feminine given names